Route 154 is a state highway in Connecticut running for . It serves as one of the main thoroughfares in the town of Old Saybrook, intersecting  twice with U.S. Route 1. North of I-95, Route 154 runs parallel to Route 9, along to the west bank of the Connecticut River. The route ends in Middletown at Route 9.

Route description

Route 154 begins at US 1 in Old Saybrook. It heads south on Great Hammock Road as it is parallel to the Long Island Sound. It becomes known as Plum Bank Road, shortly before turning eastward as Indianola Drive as it enters Knollwood. Maple Avenue turns on to Route 154 as it enters Fenwick. It passes by the Fenwick Golf Course just prior to passing over the South Cove. It becomes Bridge Street for a short time before executing a sharp turn to the west as College Street, and later Main Street.

Route 154 soon turns north, passing just to the west of North Cove. It then becomes concurrent with US 1 prior to intersecting Interstate 95 as the Middlesex Turnpike. Proceeding north, it intersects Route 9 before passing near South Cove, a separate cove than the one previously crossed over, although they are both an extension of the Connecticut River. It then intersects Route 9 again, before turning slightly east of north, and intersecting it for a third time. It then becomes known as Main Street while traveling parallel to the Connecticut River. It then intersects Route 148.

Route 154 becomes known as Saybrook Road before becoming concurrent with Route 82. It passes near the Haddam Meadows State Park as it once again becomes known as the Middlesex Turnpike. It intersects Route 81 as it becomes known as Saybrook Road again. Route 154 travels closely parallel to Route 9 near its north end. At the exit 10 interchange of Route 9, Route 154 continues as the Route 9 northbound onramp for its last , until it ends at the merge with northbound Route 9.

The southern loop portion of Route 154 in Old Saybrook, from its beginning at Saybrook Manor (milepost 0.00) to the east junction with Old Boston Post Road in Old Saybrook Center (milepost 6.10) is a state scenic road. This portion of Route 154 serves the borough of Fenwick. The section of Route 154 in the town of Haddam (9.16 miles long) is also a state scenic road. This portion of the route runs alongside the west bank of the Connecticut River.

History
The road connecting Old Saybrook and Wethersfield along the west bank of the Connecticut River was a toll road known as the Middlesex Turnpike, which operated from 1802 to 1876. In 1922, the Middlesex Turnpike alignment became part of New England Interstate Route 10 (renumbered to Route 9 in 1932). At the same time, a loop route in Old Saybrook, serving the borough of Fenwick was designated as State Highway 338.

Route 154 was established in 1932 as a renumbering of old State Highway 338. Its original route started at US 1 in Old Saybrook Center and followed Main Street then College Street to Saybrook Point, then continued through Fenwick along Maple Avenue to end at itself just south of the town center. In 1935, a section of Maple Avenue between Summerfield Road and Main Street was redesignated Route 154A and the western part of the loop moved to the current alignment along Plum Bank Road and Great Hammock Road (former SR 603). In 1963, Route 154A was turned over to the town of Old Saybrook.

In 1967, with the opening of the Route 9 freeway, the former surface route of Route 9 between US 1 and Essex Road in Old Saybrook was transferred to Route 154. The rest of the former surface route of Route 9 became Route 9A in 1968. In 1986, the entire length of Route 9A was transferred to Route 154, extending the northern terminus to its current location in southern Middletown.

Junction list

References

External links

154
Transportation in Middlesex County, Connecticut